Anclote High School is a public high school in Holiday, Florida, United States. The school opened in August 24, 2009 with grades 9 through 12; the first graduating class was in 2011. Vanessa Moon is the principal.

History
The school, designated as High School FFF in Pasco County Schools' long-range plans, was named Anclote High School by vote of the Pasco School Board in September 2008.

Anclote High School opened in August 24, 2009 to relieve crowding at J.W. Mitchell High School and Gulf High School.

Campus
The buildings, designed by Holmes Hepner & Associates, are slated to be LEED certified. The campus is designed to enhance grouping into four professional learning communities: Business and Technology Community, Arts and Communication Community, Health and Human Services Community, Engineering and Science Community.

Curriculum
The school's learning communities offer relevant elective coursework to the community theme, such as :
courses in sports, law studies, and health sciences in the Health and Human Services Community,
courses in art, journalism, multimedia production, music and dance performance in the Arts and Communication Community,
courses in business cooperative education, information technology and networking in the Business and Technology Community, and
courses in culinary arts and energy leadership for the Energy Academy, a career academy, in the Engineering and Sciences Community.

The Energy Academy, supported by a partnership with Progress Energy and TECO, will lead to industry certification for entry positions within the energy industries.

The Anclote High School teams, known as the Sharks, participate in Class 5A in football and Class 4A in most other sports.

References

External links
Anclote High School

Educational institutions established in 2009
High schools in Pasco County, Florida
Public high schools in Florida
2009 establishments in Florida